The Padilla family is a Filipino family of entertainers, politicians and athletes.

List of members

 José Padilla Sr. 
 married María Clara Ruiz; they had three children
  José Padilla Jr. 
 married Arsenia Francisco, they had six children
 Carlos Padilla Sr. 
 married Melania Dolorico
Carlos Padilla Jr. 
married Esperanza Perez 
Zsa Zsa Padilla 
married Modesto Tatlonghari
Karylle 
married Yael Yuzon 
with Dolphy, had two children: Zia and Nicole.
Zia Quizon 
Melanie Padilla 
 married Virgilio Javate  
 Gino Padilla 
 married Concepcion Canno, they have two children.
Josh Padilla 
  Roy Padilla 
 married Eva Cariño
BB Gandanghari 
married Carmina Villaroel  (annulled)
Robin Padilla 
married Liezl Sicangco, they have three children: Queenie, Ali and Kylie.
Queenie Padilla
Kylie Padilla
married Aljur Abrenica, they have two children: Alas and Axl.
married Mariel Rodriguez, they have two children: Isabella and Gabriela.
Rommel Padilla 
with Karla Estrada had
Daniel Padilla 
married Annabelle Antonio, they have three children: RJ, Roanna and Matt.
RJ Padilla 
married Rosalie Abdelsayed, they have one child: Raniaah Amira. 
Royette Padilla 
Pilar Padilla 
married Gregorio Fernandez
Rudy Fernandez 
married Lorna Tolentino 
Renz Fernandez 
Ralph Fernandez 
with Alma Moreno had
Mark Anthony Fernandez
 married Melissa Garcia, they have one child.
Grae Fernandez
Amado Cortez 
married Gloria Sevilla

References 

Padilla family
Show business families of the Philippines